John E. Flynn (April 10, 1912 – September 23, 2003) was an American politician a from New York. He served as the 31st Mayor of Yonkers from 1961 to 1966. He then was elected to the New York State Senate from 1967 to 1986.

Life
He was born on April 10, 1912, in Yonkers, Westchester County, New York, to John and Mary Agnes Drohan Flynn. As a young man, he developed a hard work ethic while working at the Alexander Smith Carpet Mill in Yonkers. He worked irregular hours, which included work on Saturday. He attended New York University and Columbia University, and then became a business executive.

He entered politics as a Republican, and was Mayor of Yonkers from 1961 to 1966. He was a member of the New York State Senate from 1967 to 1986, sitting in the 177th, 178th, 179th, 180th, 181st, 182nd, 183rd, 184th, 185th and 186th New York State Legislatures.

Flynn died on September 23, 2003.

References

1912 births
2003 deaths
Politicians from Westchester County, New York
People from Yonkers, New York
Republican Party New York (state) state senators
Mayors of places in New York (state)
New York University alumni
Columbia University alumni
20th-century American politicians